C.W. Gortner is an American author of historical fiction, including the novels The Last Queen, The Confessions of Catherine de Medici, and the Spymaster Trilogy.

His novels are translated in over 25 languages. The Queen’s Vow was an international bestseller in Poland. Mademoiselle Chanel was a USA Today best-seller, an American Booksellers Association bestseller, and both The Last Queen and Marlene were Marin Independent Journal best-sellers. He was named one of the top ten historical novelists by The Washington Independent Review of Books and has delivered keynote speeches as a Guest of Honor at the Historical Novel Society Conferences in the United States and the United Kingdom. For ten years before he was published and became a full-time writer, he was a public health administrative analyst. Previously, he worked as a fashion executive.

Personal life
Gortner was raised in Málaga, Spain and is half-Spanish by birth. His family moved back to the U.S. when he was in his teens. He holds a Bachelor of Arts in Marketing the Fashion Institute of Design and Merchandising in San Francisco and Masters of Fine Arts in Writing with a concentration in Renaissance Studies from the New College of California. He lives in Northern California.

Books
The Last Queen: A Novel Ballantine Books, (2006)
The Confessions of Catherine De Medici: A Novel Ballantine Books, (2010)
The Queen's Vow: A Novel of Isabella of Castile Ballantine Books, (2012)
Mademoiselle Chanel: A Novel William Morrow and Company, (2015)
The Vatican Princess: A Novel of Lucrezia Borgia Ballantine Books,  (2016)
Marlene: A Novel of Marlene Dietrich  William Morrow and Company  (2016)
The Romanov Empress: A Novel of Tsarina Maria Feodorovna Ballantine Books  (2018)
 The First Actress. A Novel of Sarah Bernhardt  Ballantine Books  (2020).

The Elizabeth I Spymaster Chronicles
 The Secret Lion (The Tudor Secret St. Martin's Press), (2004)
The Tudor Conspiracy St. Martin's Press, (2013)
The Tudor Vendetta St. Martin's Press,  (2014)

External links
 http://www.cwgortner.com/

References

Living people
American historical novelists
Year of birth missing (living people)
Place of birth missing (living people)
People from Málaga
New College of California alumni
Writers from California
21st-century American novelists